"You and I" is a song by English singer Will Young. It was written by Ed Johnson, Henry Johnson and Mike Peden and recorded by Young for his on his debut studio album, From Now On (2002). Produced by Peden, the song was released as Young's fourth single and 2002's official Children in Need single on 18 November 2002 along with the track "Don't Let Me Down". It reached number two on the UK Singles Chart, number three in the Netherlands, and the top thirty in Ireland and Italy.

Background
"You and I," written by Ed Johnson, Henry Johnson and Mike Peden and produced latter, is a ballad that talks about "being completely mad in love with someone." With "You and I" selected as Young's first single of original material, he cited the song as a turning point in his career.

Music video
A music video for "You and I" was directed by Tim Royes and filmed while Young was on the Pop Idol Tour with his fellow Pop Idol contestants. The video marked Royes second collaboration with Young, following their work on the video for "The Long and Winding Road" (2002). The visuals portray Young wandering around the streets. English model and actress Agyness Deyn appears in the clip.

Track listings

Credits and personnel
Credits are lifted from the From Now On album booklet.

Studio
 Mastered at Transfermation (London, England)

Personnel

 Mike Peden – writing, production
 Ed Johnson – writing
 Henry Johnson – writing
 London Community Gospel Choir – gospel choir
 Tee Green – backing vocals
 Ed Johnson – backing vocals
 Lucie Silvas – backing vocals
 Graham Kearns – guitar
 Jack Daley – bass
 Peter Gordeno – keyboards
 Charlie Russell – programming
 Nick Ingman – string arrangement, conducting
 Gavyn Wright – orchestra leader
 Isobel Griffiths Ltd. – orchestra contracting
 Martin Hayles – recording engineer
 Steve Fitzmaurice – mixing
 Richard Dowling – mastering

Charts

Weekly charts

Year-end charts

Certifications

Release history

References

External links
 "You and I" lyrics

Will Young songs
19 Recordings singles
2002 singles
2002 songs
Bertelsmann Music Group singles
Children in Need singles
RCA Records singles
Songs written by Mike Peden
Syco Music singles